Shahi Lal Dera (Red Tent, Royal red tent, Lal Dera) is an imperial Mughal tent, it is a fabric structure owned by the fifth Mughal emperor Shah Jahan. Shahi Lal Dera was used to be a moveable palace.

Features 
Shahi Lal Dera is the only surviving example of a Mughal tent in its entirety. The 17th-century encampment is part of Mehrangarh's royal collection in Jodhpur. it is a magnificent tent, Its regal status is reflected in the color red and the crenellated crown on top. Lal Dera is crafted entirely of silk, velvet, and gold. It has beautiful embroidery and brocade patterns. The tent has beautiful bolsters for the throne of the Mughal emperor, as well as lobed archways and a colonnaded interior chamber. The tent has a four-meter height ceiling, it is comparable in size to a double-decker bus. 

Abu'l-Fazl ibn Mubarak talks at length in Ain-i-Akbari about the Mughal emperors' vested interests in textiles, weapons, and Tents.

Restoring 
As of 2017, it was undergoing maintenance to clean and conserve it.

See also 

 Mughal Karkhanas
 Mughal architecture

References 

Mughal art